Cytheruridae is a family of ostracods belonging to the order Podocopida.

Genera

Genera:
 Absonocytheropteron Puri, 1957
 Acrocythere Neale, 1960
 Afghanistinia Hu & Tao, 2008

References

Ostracods